Libuše Havelková (11 May 1924 – 6 April 2017) was a Czech actress. She appeared in more than 90 films and television shows between 1957 and 2012.

Selected filmography
 September Nights (1957)
 Closely Watched Trains (1966)
 Rosy Dreams (1977)
 Jako kníže Rohan (1983)
 Babičky dobíjejte přesně! (1984)

References

External links

1924 births
2017 deaths
Actors from České Budějovice
Czech film actresses
Czech stage actresses
Czech television actresses
Merited Artists of Czechoslovakia